Integrin, beta 4 (ITGB4) also known as CD104 (Cluster of Differentiation 104), is a human gene.

Function 

Integrins are heterodimers composed of alpha and beta subunits, that are noncovalently associated transmembrane glycoprotein receptors. Different combinations of alpha and beta polypeptides form complexes that vary in their ligand-binding specificities. Integrins mediate cell-matrix or cell-cell adhesion, and transduced signals that regulate gene expression and cell growth. This gene encodes the integrin beta 4 subunit, a receptor for the laminins. This subunit tends to associate with alpha 6 subunit and is likely to play a pivotal role in the biology of invasive carcinoma. Mutations in this gene are associated with epidermolysis bullosa with pyloric atresia. Multiple alternatively spliced transcript variants encoding distinct isoforms have been found for this gene.

Interactions 

ITGB4 has been shown to interact with Collagen, type XVII, alpha 1, EIF6 and Erbin.

See also 
 Cluster of differentiation
 List of target antigens in pemphigoid

References

Further reading

External links 
  GeneReviews/NCBI/NIH/UW entry on Epidermolysis Bullosa with Pyloric Atresia
 
ITGB4 Info with links in the Cell Migration Gateway 

Clusters of differentiation
Integrins